Arenaria saxatilis may refer to:
 Arenaria saxatilis Bout. ex Willk. = Arenaria obtusiflora subsp. obtusiflora 	
 Arenaria saxatilis C. C. Gmel. = Sabulina verna subsp. verna 	
 Arenaria saxatilis L. = Eremogone saxatilis (L.) 	
 Arenaria saxatilis Vill. = Minuartia mutabilis subsp. mutabilis